The Marksman is a 1953 American Western film directed by Lewis D. Collins and starring Wayne Morris, Elena Verdugo and Frank Ferguson.

Cast
Wayne Morris as Deputy Marshal Mike Martin
Elena Verdugo as Jane Warren
Frank Ferguson as Champ Wiley
Rick Vallin as Leo Santee
I. Stanford Jolley as Marshal Bob Scott
Tom Powers as Lt. Governor Watson
Robert Bice as henchman Kincaid
Stanley Price as outlaw
Russ Whiteman as rustler
Brad Johnson as rider
William Fawcett as freight agent
Jack Rice as clerk
Tim Ryan as stagecoach driver

References

External links

1953 Western (genre) films
American Western (genre) films
Films directed by Lewis D. Collins
Allied Artists films
Films scored by Raoul Kraushaar
American black-and-white films
1950s English-language films
1950s American films